Garra paralissorhynchus is a species of cyprinid fish in the genus Garra.

References 

Garra
Fish described in 2005